The Indi language or Mag-indi (or Mag-Indi Ayta) is a Sambalic language with around 5,000 speakers. It is spoken within Philippine Aeta communities in San Marcelino, Zambales, and in the Pampango municipalities of Floridablanca (including in Nabuklod) and Porac. There are also speakers in Lumibao and Maague-ague.

See also
Languages of the Philippines

References

Further reading

  – sample phrases in Indi, Kapampangan, Tagalog and English.

External links

Endangered Austronesian languages
Sambalic languages
Aeta languages
Languages of Zambales
Languages of Pampanga